Petrophile semifurcata is a species of flowering plant in the family Proteaceae and is endemic to an area near the west coast of Western Australia. It is an erect, bushy shrub with sharply-pointed, needle-shaped, sometimes lobed leaves and oval heads of silky-hairy, whitish, lemon-yellow or cream-coloured flowers.

Description

Taxonomy
Petrophile semifurcata was first formally described in 1870 by George Bentham in Flora Australiensis from an unpublished description by Ferdinand von Mueller of material collected by Augustus Frederick Oldfield near the Murchison River. The specific epithet (semifurcata) means "half-forked", referring to the sometime simple, sometimes forked leaves.

Distribution and habitat
This petrophile grows in heath on sandy-gravelly soils, sometimes with Banksia species and is found mainly between Geraldton and Kalbarri in the Avon Wheatbelt, Carnarvon, Geraldton Sandplains and Yalgoo biogeographic regions in the west of Western Australia.

Conservation status
Petrophile semifurcata is classified as "not threatened" by the Government of Western Australia Department of Parks and Wildlife.

References

semifurcata
Eudicots of Western Australia
Endemic flora of Western Australia
Plants described in 1870
Taxa named by Ferdinand von Mueller
Taxa named by George Bentham